The 2019 FC Tokyo season is their 8th consecutive season in J1 League after finishing the 2018 season in 6th place. They will also compete in the J.League Cup and Emperor's Cup.

Squad 
As of 16 February 2019.

Competitions

J1 League

League table

Matches

J. League Cup

Results

Emperor's Cup

References 

Tokyo
FC Tokyo seasons